Advantage Business Marketing (ABM) was a private American digital marketing and information services company owned by the venture capital firm Owner Resource Group. The company was founded in 2006 and was based in Rockaway, New Jersey, United States. It filed for bankruptcy in June 2019.

Business model 
In the period between 2006 and 2014, the company transitioned from print-centric to digital media, increasing digital revenues from 11% to 50% of total revenues.  The company's growth during this period came from both "organic" growth and strategic acquisitions.

In 2018, the organization transitioned fully from a digital media organization to a digital marketing organization, following market trends. As such, the company changed its name from Advantage Business Media to Advantage Business Marketing, updated its logo, and began the overhaul of its digital websites and assets.

The organization offered digital marketing services including inbound marketing, branding, automation services, customer relationship management integration, and data management.

History 
In 2006, Rich Reiff and George Fox purchased several publications from Reed Business Information with the backing of private equity provided by Catalyst Investors.  Catalyst sold ABM to Owner Resource Group in 2014.

In 2011, ABM acquired Continuity Insights and Vicon Publishing; this was followed in 2013 by acquisition of eMedia Vitals.  Vicon Publishing was renamed by ABM to Vicon Business Media and instantiated as a subsidiary organization.  Vicon operates out of New Hampshire, United States.

In 2014, Jim Lonergan was brought in as CEO by investment firm Owners Resource Group.

In 2018, Lonergan was replaced by Bruce Cummings and the company rebranded, changing its name to Advantage Business Marketing.

On June 11, 2019, Cummings held a staff meeting where he told all employees that the company was filing for bankruptcy and closing effective immediately. Staff had until the end of the day to vacate the premises. No severance pay was given to employees, customers lost much of what they'd purchased, and many vendors were never paid.

Titles published by ABM 
, ABM published 23 titles. Publication titles and ISO 4 abbreviations are as follows:

ALN Magazine (ALN Mag.)
ALN World (ALN World), no longer published
Bioscience Technology (Biosci. Technol.)
CED, formerly Communications, Engineering & Design
Chem.Info
Continuity Insights (Cont. Ins.), no longer an ABM brand
Chromatography Techniques (Chromatogr. Tech.), no longer an ABM brand
Controlled Environments Magazine (Control. Environ. Mag.)
DFI News Digital Forensic Investigator (DFI News Digit. Forensic Investig.), no longer published
Drug Discovery & Development (Drug Discov. Dev. also DDD Mag.)
Electronic Component News (Electron. Compon. News also ECN)
Food Manufacturing (Food Manuf.)
Forensic Magazine (Forensic Mag.)
Industrial Distribution (Ind. Distribution)
Industrial Maintenance & Plant Operations (Ind. Maintenance Plant Oper.)
Laboratory Design (Lab. Des.)
Laboratory Equipment (Lab. Equip.)
Manufacturing Business Technology (Manuf. Bus. Technol.)
Manufacturing.net (Manuf. Net.)
Medical Design Technology (Med. Des. Technol.)
Pharmaceutical Processing (Pharm. Process.)
Product Design & Development (Prod. Des. Dev.)
R&D Magazine (R&D Mag.)
Scientific Computing (Sci. Comput.)
Surgical Products (Surg. Prod.)
Wireless Design & Development (Wirel. Des. Dev.)
Wireless Week (Wirel. Week)

References 

Marketing companies of the United States
2006 establishments in New Jersey
Mass media companies established in 2006